Piggyback transportation refers to the transportation of goods where one transportation unit is carried on the back of something else. It is a specialised form of intermodal transportation and combined transport.

Etymology 
Piggyback is a corruption of pickaback, which is likely to be a folk etymology alteration of pick pack (1560s), which perhaps is from pick, a dialectal variant of the verb pitch.

Examples

Rail 

In rail transport, the practice of carrying trailers or semi-trailers in a train atop a flatcar is referred to as "piggybacking". Early drawings of the Liverpool & Manchester Railway c1830 show road coaches being piggybacked on railway flat wagons.

The rail service provided for trucks which are carried on trains for part of their journey is referred to as a rolling road, or rolling highway. A related transportation method is the rail transport of semi-trailers, without road tractors, sometimes referred to as "trailer on flatcar (TOFC)". In the United States, TOFC traffic grew from 1% of freight in 1957 to 5% in 1964 and 15% in 1986.

A railway wagon of one track gauge can be carried on a flat wagon (transporter wagon or rollbock) of another gauge. In addition,  an entire train of coupled wagons of one gauge can be carried on continuous rails on a train of flat wagons of another gauge. This was achieved by the Commonwealth Railways on the Marree railway line in South Australia between Telford Cut and Port Augusta in the mid-1950s. Japan Railways planned a similar "Train on Train" scheme, but at much higher speeds, to operate from 2016.

Marine 
Small ships of all kinds can be piggybacked on larger ships. Examples include lifeboats, landing craft, and minesweepers on motherships, as well as midget submarines on larger submarines, such as those used for the 1942 Japanese submarine attack on Sydney.

Air transport 
The 1930s British Short Mayo Composite, in which a smaller, four-engine floatplane aircraft named Mercury was carried aloft on the back of a larger four-engine flying boat named Maia, enabled the Mercury to achieve a greater range than would have been possible had it taken off under its own power. The American Space Shuttle was carried on top of specially-modified Boeing 747 Shuttle Carrier Aircraft when the shuttle landed at places other than Kennedy Space Center.

Space 
In space transportation systems, a smaller satellite that is carried as a secondary payload on a launch is said to be "piggybacked" on the main launch. It is often the case of small satellites and cubesats, since they can not usually afford accessing space on a dedicated launch and they choose instead to take profit of the remaining payload capacity in a big satellite launch. However, this is usually at the cost of not being able to fly to their desired orbit and having to remain on a similar orbit to that of the big satellite.

Military 
The metal caterpillar treads of a tank wear out quickly when travelling long distances on ordinary roads.  Also, tracked vehicles seriously damage the tarmac layer of ordinary roads (unless the caterpillar treads are specially fitted with rubber pads to avoid this). It is therefore necessary to provide tank transporters, which have rubber tires, to the battlefield.

Human locomotion 
A person carrying someone else on their back is most commonly seen in the modern day in the form of a parent carrying a child. It may also feature in the context of play or sport, and evidence of this dates back to ancient Greece where games involving piggyback riding were combined with the requirement of catching or throwing a ball.

Gallery

See also 

 Autorack
 Bière–Apples–Morges Railway
 Car carrier trailer
 Car float
 Double-stack rail transport
 Ferry
 Fireman's carry
 Hupac
 Konkan Railway Corporation
 Loading gauge
 Modalohr
 Motorail
 Pichi Richi Railway
 Roadrailer
 Rolling highway
 Roll-on/roll-off
 Structure gauge
 Train ferry
 Two-foot-gauge railways in South Africa

References

External links 

 Double Piggyback p120
 RGI Modalohr

Transport operations
Intermodal transport